Tadeusz Jankowski (20 April 1930 – 24 May 2022) was a Polish cross-country skier. He competed in the men's 15 kilometre event at the 1964 Winter Olympics.

He died in Zakopane on 24 May 2022, at the age of 92.

References

External links
 

1930 births
2022 deaths
Polish male cross-country skiers
Olympic cross-country skiers of Poland
Cross-country skiers at the 1964 Winter Olympics
People from Lesko County